This is a complete listing of awards and nominations received by Scottish-American alternative rock band Garbage. Garbage have received twenty-two nominations, winning seven awards. Major awards which Garbage have been nominated for include the Grammy Awards and the BRIT Awards.

List of awards

Billboard Music Video Awards

!Ref.
|-
| 1999
| "Special"
| Best Modern Rock Clip
| 
|

D&AD Awards

D&AD Awards

|-
| 1999
| "Special"
| Best Direction in Pop Promo Video (Silver)
|

Danish Music Awards
Danish Music Awards

|-
| 1996
| "Stupid Girl"
| Best Rock Song 
|

GAFFA Awards
Gaffa (magazine)

!Ref.
|-
| 1995
| rowspan=4|Themselves 
| rowspan=2|Best Foreign New Act
| 
|rowspan=5|
|-
| 1996 
| 
|-
| rowspan=3|1998
| Best Foreign Group
| 
|-
| Best Foreign Live Act
| 
|-
| Version 2.0
| Best Foreign Album
|

Grammy Awards
Grammy Awards:

BRIT Awards
BRIT Awards:

Hungarian Music Awards
Hungarian Music Awards

{| class="wikitable"
|-  style="background:#b0c4de; text-align:center;"
!Year
!Category
!Recipient/Work
!Result
|-
| 2002
| Best Foreign Rock Album
| Beautifulgarbage
|

International Dance Music Awards

International Dance Music Awards

|-
| 1999
| "Push It"
| Best Alternative 12'
|

Kerrang! Awards

!Ref.
|-
| 1996
| Butch Vig
| Kerrang! Creativity Award
| 
|

Lunas del Auditorio

|- 
| 2003
| rowspan=2|Themselves
| rowspan=2|Best Foreign Rock Artist 
| 
|-
| 2006
|

MM Music Awards

MM Music Awards

|-
| 2002
| "Cherry Lips"
| Best International Video
|

MTV Europe Music Awards
MTV Europe Music Awards:

MTV Video Music Awards
MTV Video Music Awards:

MTV Movie Awards
MTV Movie Awards:

MVPA Awards

|-
| rowspan="5" | 1999
| rowspan="4" | "Push It"
| Best Make-Up
| 
|-
| Best Hair
| 
|-
| Best Styling 
| 
|-
| Best Alternative Video
| 
|-
| "Special"
| Best Special Effects
| 
|-
| 2006
| "Bleed Like Me"
| Director of the Year
| 
|-
| 2008
| "Tell Me Where It Hurts"
| Director of the Year
|

Music Television Awards

|-
| rowspan="6" | 1996
| rowspan="3" | Garbage
| Best Breakthrough
| 
|-
| Best Alternative
| 
|-
| Best Group
| 
|-
| Garbage
| Best Album
| 
|-
| "Stupid Girl"
| Best Song 
| 
|-
| "Queer"
| rowspan="2" | Best Video
| 
|-
| rowspan="3" | 1998
| "Push It"
| 
|-
| rowspan="2" | Garbage
| Best Group
| 
|-
| Best Rock Act
|

Music Week Awards

 Music Week Awards

|-
| 1999
| "Special"
| Best Special Effects
|

NME Awards

 NME Awards

|-
| 1996
| rowspan=2|Themselves
| Best New Band
| 
|-
| rowspan=3|1999
| Best Band
| 
|-
| Version 2.0
| Best Album
| 
|-
| "I Think I'm Paranoid"
| Best Single
|

Online Film & Television Association

!Ref.
|-
| 1999
| "The World Is Not Enough"
| Best Original Song
| 
|

Pollstar Concert Industry Awards

 Pollstar Concert Industry Awards

!Ref.
|-
| 1997
| rowspan=2|Garbage 
| Best New Artist Tour
| 
|-
| 2022
| Best Support/Special Guest Act and Tour
| 
|

BMI Awards
BMI Awards:

VH1 Fashion Awards

 VH1 Fashion Awards

|-
| 1999
| "Special"
| Visionary Award
|

WAMI Awards
Wisconsin Area Music Industry Awards:

Žebřík Music Awards

!Ref.
|-
| 1998
| rowspan=4|Shirley Manson
| rowspan=4|Best International Female
| 
| rowspan=3|
|-
| 1999
| 
|-
| 2001
| 
|-
| rowspan=2|2005
| 
| rowspan=2|
|-
| Garbage
| Best International Group
|

References

Awards
Lists of awards received by American musician
Lists of awards received by British musician
Lists of awards received by musical group